Antigoni Drisbioti, born 21 March 1984 in Karditsa, is a Greek race walker who represented Greece at the 2020 Olympics taking the 8th place and at the 2016 Olympics, finishing in the 15th place.

Drisbioti also competed at the 2013 World Championships and at the 2014 European Championships, while she won the bronze medal at the 2013 Mediterranean Games in Mersin. At the 2022 European Athletics Championships in Munich she won an imperssive double of gold medals, both in the event of 20km walk and in the event of 35km walk.

Competition record

References

External links
 
 Antigoni Drisbioti at All-Athletics
 Antigoni Drisbioti at Olympic.org
 http://sportsfeed.gr/panellinio-kleistou-me-no1-fetos-ston-kosmo/

1984 births
Living people
Athletes from Karditsa
Greek female racewalkers
Athletes (track and field) at the 2016 Summer Olympics
Athletes (track and field) at the 2020 Summer Olympics
Olympic athletes of Greece
Mediterranean Games bronze medalists for Greece
Mediterranean Games medalists in athletics
Athletes (track and field) at the 2013 Mediterranean Games
20th-century Greek women
21st-century Greek women
Greek European Athletics champions (track and field)